.sv is the Internet country code top-level domain (ccTLD) for El Salvador.

Microsoft's Internet Explorer 6 has a bug in its Swedish version where .sv is used instead of .se when typing ctrl+return for appending the suffix.

Second-level domains 
 edu.sv: Education and/or research institutions
 gob.sv: National governmental institutions
 com.sv: Commercial entities and other not included in the rest
 org.sv: Non-profit Organizations
 red.sv: National network administration
 ts.sv: Trade Shift

See also 
 Internet in El Salvador

References

External links 
 IANA .sv whois information
 .sv domain registration website
 General policies for assigning sub-domain names and/or IP addresses under the geographical domain of El Salvador, SV
 Additional .SV Registrar

Country code top-level domains
Communications in El Salvador
Computer-related introductions in 1994
1994 establishments in El Salvador
Internet in El Salvador

sv:Toppdomän#S